The Ein al Zeitun massacre occurred on May 1, 1948, during the 1948 War, at the Palestinian Arab village of Ein al-Zeitun just north of Safed, then part of the British Mandate for Palestine. According to various historians, 23-70 Arab prisoners may have been killed by the Palmach.

Massacre
Ein al Zeitun at this time was a Palestinian Arab village of about 800 inhabitants. It was believed by local Jews that Arabs from the village had taken part in a 1929 massacre of Jews in Safed and the massacre is assumed to be as a point of revenge.  The attack on Ein al Zeitun was conducted by the 3rd Battalion of the Palmach under the command of Moshe Kelman, as a preliminary operation to prepare for an assault on the Arab quarter of Safed. Davidka mortar bombs were used for the first time. The village was taken without much difficulty. Most of the villagers fled during the battle, and the remainder, apart from 30 to 100 men aged 20-40 were forcibly expelled afterwards.

The Palmach soldiers then began to destroy the village. Palmach officer Elad Peled recalled that “our men began blowing up the village. The intoxication of victory blinded them and they went berserk, breaking and destroying property. The Jews of Safad saw Ein Zeitun blown up and crushed, and were "happy", seeing in it vengeance for what the  Arabs of Ein Zeitun carried out against the Jews of Safad and Ein Zeitim.”

One Yiftah HQ report says that "30" Arab prisoners were "transferred to Golani [Brigade]". But a day or two later two Palmach soldiers, acting on Third Battalion OC Moshe Kelman's orders, murdered several dozen prisoners, probably including young men from Ein al-Zeitun, in the gully between Ein al-Zeitun  and Safad.  According to Netiva Ben-Yehuda, the captive men were tied up and thrown into the deep gully between Ein al Zeitun and left for two days. Kelman then decided to "get rid of this problem altogether" but most of his men refused. Finally, he found two willing to do it, and the prisoners were killed. Two days later, word of the massacre leaked out, and it was feared that British or UN investigators would arrive, so some soldiers, including Ben-Yehuda, were detailed to untie the corpses and bury them.

According to a testimony Aharon Yo'eli, a soldier present, obtained by Israeli historian Uri Milstein "2 Israelis came from Safad and took 23 men from Ayn Zaytoon, stripped them of watches and wallets, took them to a hill and shot them. Israelis were looking for other Israelis to kill Arabs; many Jews in Safad were Hassidis (strictly observant). Other Arabs were expelled towards Germak mountain".

Aftermath
The Syrians subsequently charged that "women had been raped".

The destruction of Ein al Zeitun and the consequent massacre terrified the Arabs of Safed and probably contributed to their flight in the coming days.

Hans Lebrecht says he was ordered to build a temporary pump station and divert the village stream, Ayn Zaytun, to supply water to his battalion. The village had been destroyed, and among the debris there were many bodies. "In particular, we found many bodies of women, children and babies near the local mosque. I convinced the army to burn the bodies."

See also
Depopulated Palestinian locations in Israel
Zionist political violence

References

Bibliography

Abbasi, M. (2004). The battle for Safad in the war of 1948: A revised study.  International Journal of Middle East Studies, vol. 36, 21–47.
  (p. 130)
 (pp. 222-223)
 p. 36.
Pappé, Ilan (2006): The Ethnic Cleansing of Palestine, London and New York: Oneworld,  p.111-113
Quigley, John B. (2005). Case for Palestine: An International Law Perspective. Duke University Press. , p. 61.

History of Mandatory Palestine
Massacres in Mandatory Palestine
May 1948 events in Asia
Zionist terrorism
1948 massacres of Palestinians